Undocumented is a 2010 independent horror thriller directed by Chris Peckover and written by Chris Peckover and Joe Peterson.  It stars Scott Mechlowicz, Alona Tal, Yancey Arias, Kevin Weisman and Peter Stormare.

Plot

Filmmakers Travis, William, Liz, Davie, and Jim are filming a documentary on illegal Mexican immigrants. After interviewing several of Davie's family members and harassing an employer of illegal immigrants named Whitaker, the group accompanies a large group of immigrants including Davie's cousin Alberto and his wife and child, across the Mexico–United States border.

Once in the United States, the truck carrying the immigrants is stopped and taken by what seems to be the United States Border Patrol. The truck is instead taken to a facility where the filmmakers are interrogated and the immigrants taken captive. The group that has taken them is a radical patriot group that despises illegal immigrants, Mexicans in particular. The patriots, led by "Z," gives the filmmakers a proposition; film the patriots and document their torture of illegal immigrants, and be let free, or die along with the immigrants. The leader of the patriots lets all of the immigrant children go, including Alberto's daughter.

The first part the filmmakers must film is the torture of an immigrant who smuggles drugs across the border into the U.S. Liz tries to intervene but the immigrant is beaten to death. The next morning, one of Z's henchman give the filmmakers a tour of the facility. When they are shown around the "pens" holding men and women, Alberto becomes enraged and is sprayed by a high pressure hose. Alberto is then taken to a room where he is quizzed on America's government and history. If he gets a question wrong, Alberto's wife's joints are pulled into stress positions. When asked which historical figure said "Give me liberty, or give me death!", Alberto incorrectly answers Thomas Jefferson after being given the answer by William, causing Alberto's wife and William to be killed.

The same night, the group tries to escape from the facility in the cover of darkness by using the night vision mode on their camera. During the attempt, Travis knocks over a metal fence, causing Z's wife to check on the imprisoned immigrants, where the filmmakers are hiding. After a close call, the group escapes outside, where they find the body of Alberto's daughter caught in razor wire. Alberto's grieving alerts Z's henchman and a watchdog that mangles Jim's arm and leg. The group is recaptured, with a permanent guard standing watch outside of their room. They are then forced to record a conscious immigrants organ removal, where the appalling scene causes Jim to collapse. When the filmmakers visit Jim, Liz gets into an altercation with Z, leading to them being trapped back in their room.

After trying to signal a truck that was unknowingly operated by one of Z's henchmen, Davie's aunt is killed, leading to Davie being beaten to death after attacking a henchman. Travis is then forced to "interview" Whitaker and the coyote who led the immigrants into Mexico. Both are subsequently killed by Z. As a "parting gift," Liz and Travis are branded with the radical group's symbol. A sedated and delirious Travis is forced to swing a baseball bat at a pinata that is unknowingly wrapped around Jim. Liz attempts to kill Z with the bat, but is also sedated before she can strike him.

Travis and Liz are told they will be kept indefinitely. When the henchman in charge of guarding Travis and Liz gets impatient, Travis beats him to death and steals his gun, shooting a second henchman in the leg. Travis and Liz release the immigrants and save Alberto. When they attempt to start an old truck, Z nearly kills Travis, but he is shot by Alberto before doing so. After escaping, it is shown that the three reached help, and state police raided the compound. Alberto is sent back to Mexico after nine months and anonymous tapes are sent to a media center in Arizona, showing Z with an even larger group.

Cast

 Scott Mechlowicz as Travis
 Alona Tal as Liz
 Peter Stormare as Z
 Yancey Arias as Alberto
 Kevin Weisman as Jim
 Greg Serano as Davie
 Noah Segan as Klaus
 Nicholas Tucci as The Artist
 Adam Kulbersh as Remy
 Jose Marquez as Miguel
 Deborah Martinez as Ophelia
 Castulo Guerra as Coyote
 Greta Quezada	as Marta
 Julianne Flores as Pregnant Girl
 Miguel Martinez as Donor
 Nya Serano as Davie's Daughter
 Myrna Vigil as Hysterical Woman
 Giovanni Olsen as Grandson
 Marc Miles as Sheriff
 Richard Christie as Deputy
 Emelie O'Hara as Student #1
 Arron Shiver as Film Professor
 Kevin Wiggins	as Tow Truck Driver
 Jsu Garcia as El Torro
 Leonardo Krys as the Judge
 Tom Connolly as Brad
 Tim Draxl as William
 Christopher Dempsey as Border Patrol Officer Marsh
 Chad Brummett	as Whitaker
 Adam Kulbersh as Remy
 Christian Di Salvo as Dead Body
 Rafael Herrera as Bushy eyebrows
 Amy Baklini as Prisoner
 Casey Adams as Student
 Carmen Corral as Maria
 Jesus Mayorga	as Cholo
 Lorél Medina as Selina
 Tina Borek as Maid Maria
 Chris Bentley	as Graduate Student

References

External links
 
 

2010 films
2010 horror thriller films
American independent films
American horror thriller films
Found footage films
2010 independent films
Films produced by Keith Calder
Films about illegal immigration to the United States
Films about filmmaking
Films set in Arizona
Torture in films
2010s English-language films
2010s American films